Henry Jackson "Choc" Sanders (July 26, 1900 – March 16, 1972) was a college football player, coach and teacher. He was the first All-American for the Southern Methodist University Mustangs.

Head coaching record

References

External links
 

1900 births
1972 deaths
All-Southern college football players
American football guards
People from Garland, Texas
Players of American football from Texas
SMU Mustangs football players
Sportspeople from the Dallas–Fort Worth metroplex
Tarleton State Texans football coaches